The Commonwealth Railways F Class was a 2-6-0 tender engine built by the Baldwin Locomotive Works in 1885 for the New South Wales Government Railways as their K class and later sold to the Commonwealth Railways becoming their F class.

History 
10 locomotives designed by Mr W. Scott were ordered by the NSWGR from the Baldwin Locomotive Works in 1884. They were classed as 'K' and entered service in 1885 but were found to be bad at building up steam and so were put on coal trains in the Newcastle districit. Around the same time that the Commonwealth Railways had purchased their Commonwealth Railways D class they obtained a single example of the NSWGR K class. The  locomotive in question was K295 and was reclassed as the F class and numbered 55. The engine was obtained to shunt the wharf at Port Augusta. Originally the Commonwealth Railways (CR) had requested an I class (Z26 class) but K295 was the only NSWGR loco available. F55 wasn't in good condition but was needed urgently and was pushed into service at the wharf straight after being unloaded in June 1915. However F55 was unfit for the work and was taken out of service on 6 June 1916. It was then officially withdrawn in November 1921 it then stood in the scrap line for 6 years before finally being scrapped in June 1937.

Class list

References 

Railway locomotives introduced in 1915
Baldwin locomotives

Standard gauge locomotives of Australia

F class
2-6-0 locomotives
Scrapped locomotives
Freight locomotives